Brean Leisure Park is an amusement park in the coastal resort of Brean, near Burnham-on-Sea, Somerset, England.

Open from March to November every year, the leisure park has also been a concert venue for artists such as DJ Casper,
Peter Andre,
Jason Donovan and The Wurzels. Sky filmed an episode of Brainiac: Science Abuse entitled "Funfair Physics"  at the park. An episode of BBC TV series Casualty was also filmed there in 2007 and again 2013. And an episode of CBBC TV series The Sparticle Mystery was filmed of the titled of the episode The FunFair. In 1997 there was location filming for Rosie and Jim of the characters riding a Merry-go-Round.

History

1946 - 1970s 

In 1946 Albert and Marie House bought Unity Farm, and for the next 30 years operated it primarily as a dairy farm with a herd of 140 cows. They later supplied the local area with milk that was bottled on the farm.

As far back as 1946 camping was a popular past time and Fry's Chocolate Factory from Bristol pitched large tents on three fields on Unity Farm for a two-week period during the summer so therefore their employees could have a holiday by the seaside such as local areas being Brean, Berrow  and Burnham-on-sea. The way Holiday Resort Unity is at present age started from this very stage and it wasn't long before many groups of people including the local Boy's Brigade Troops were coming to Brean to venture and have holidays.

In 1948 planning permission was granted to change the use of some of the farm land to caravans and camping and 20 acres was converted prior for this use. However, during the 1950s and 1960s caravan and camping became a bigger part of Unity Farm (presently known as Holiday Resort Unity) and slowly the number of cows, pigs and sheep decreased.

1970s - 1980s 

During the 1970s and the 1980s the beginnings of Brean Leisure Park were created along with the Mid Somerset Golf Centre which included Target Golf, driving range, pitch and putt and also an 8-hole golf course was opened alongside the other features. Throughout the years additional recreational activities were created which included a swimming pool, donkey derby's and open air markets.

A greyhound racing track was opened on 3 July 1975. The racing was independent (not affiliated to the sports governing body the National Greyhound Racing Club) and was known as a flapping track, which was the nickname given to independent tracks. 

Brean Leisure Park as a whole was now attracting a lot of visitors from South Wales, Bristol and Birmingham and in the late 1970s the House family bought out all of the other directors so that they could concentrate on developing leisure and holiday facilities.

The 8 hole golf course was expanded so that it could host 18 holes and Brean Golf Club was created. The course hosted a number of pro and celebrity amateur tournaments as well as becoming a members club and a facility for holiday guests.

In 1980 the complex known today as the 'Tavern' was opened and was previously known as the 'Farmers Tavern' providing a venue for evening family entertainment, functions and weddings. The complex also included an Amusement arcade and Fast Food outlets.

The greyhound track closed on 12 March 1984  and to improve the look of the park a significant landscaping project was undertaken across both Brean Leisure Park and Unity Farm (presently known as Holiday Resort Unity).

1990s 

Further facilities were added during the 1990s including a river type ride at the Swimming Pool complex (presently known as Brean Splash) and also the addition of two Ten-Pin Bowling lanes at Unity Farm (Holiday Resort Unity) in 1994.

2000 - 2010 

In 2000 one of the biggest projects that the resort took on since it had first opened its doors began, and this was the RJ's Entertainment complex which was a one million investment in the resort. The American-themed venue replaced Bert's bar and Chicks Roost with a venue with a capacity of approximately 700 people.

In 2008 it became the home of Sooty, Sweep and Soo, when Richard Cadell bought the rights from HIT Entertainment.

On Friday 18/7/2014 the park was sold to a family from Barry Island in South Wales.

Current Main Attractions

Notable Past Rides

Gallery

Brean Splash
Brean Splash is a waterpark owned and managed by Holiday Resort Unity under the Brean Leisure Park branding. In 2014 Brean Splash made a £2 Million (GBP) investment on a brand new indoor splash aspect of the waterpark which has been operating since summer 2014.

References

External links
Official site

Amusement parks in England
Sedgemoor
Tourist attractions in Somerset
1970s establishments in England
Buildings and structures in Sedgemoor